Kyriakos Evangelidakis (born 2 January 1994) is a Greek professional footballer who plays as a right-back.

References

1994 births
Living people
Greek footballers
Super League Greece players
Football League (Greece) players
Gamma Ethniki players
AEL Kalloni F.C. players
Fokikos A.C. players
Diagoras F.C. players
Association football defenders
People from Lemnos
Sportspeople from the North Aegean